Agro may refer to:
 Agro, a shortened form of agronomy or agriculture

People with the surname
 Thomas Agro, New York gangster
 Vince Agro, Canadian politician

Places
 Agro Park, a Malaysian park formally known as Malaysia Agro Exposition Park Serdang
 Agro Pontino, the Pontine Marshes of central Italy
 Agro Romano, Latin for the Ager Romanus, agricultural areas surrounding Rome

Organizations
 Agro Bank Malaysia
 Agro ParisTech, a French university-level institution in life sciences and agronomy
 Bloom Agro, an Indonesian social enterprise for sustainable agriculture
 Bumitama Gunajaya Agro, a palm oil company in Jakarta
 Danish Agro, a cooperative farm supply company in Denmark
 National Bio and Agro-Defense Facility (NBAF), United States government-run animal disease research facility

Entertainment
 Agro, the name of the main character's horse from the videogame Shadow of the Colossus
 Agro (puppet), an Australian puppet and media personality
 Agro's Cartoon Connection, an Australian children's television show

Other uses
 Agrobacterium, a genus of bacteria
 AGRO (exhibition), a Ukrainian exhibition for agriculture
 Agro-terrorism
 Agro-town, a residential agglomeration in a rural environment
 Agro, a computer gaming concept also known as Hate (MMORPG terminology)
 John Agro Special Teams Award, named after the first legal counsel for the Canadian Football League Players Association

See also

 Aggro (disambiguation)